Tyran Wishart (born 17 November 1999) is an Australian rugby league footballer who plays as a  or  for the Melbourne Storm in the NRL.

Background
Wishart is the son of former Illawarra Steelers and St. George Illawarra Dragons er Rod Wishart. 

He played his junior rugby league for the Gerringong Lions. Wishart was educated at Kiama High School before playing junior representative for the St George Illawarra Dragons. He then signed his first senior contract with Melbourne Storm.

Playing career
Wishart made his debut in round 1 of the 2022 NRL season for Melbourne Storm against Wests Tigers. He had his jersey (cap 202) presented to him by his father and former Illawarra Steelers player Rod Wishart.

Wishart would make 15 appearances for Melbourne during 2022, mostly being used as a utility off the interchange bench. His season was cut short by a syndesmosis injury in round 23.

References

External links
Storm profile

1999 births
Living people
Australian rugby league players
Melbourne Storm players
Rugby league halfbacks
Rugby league players from New South Wales
Sunshine Coast Falcons players